Like Two Drops of Water is a 1963 Dutch drama film directed by Fons Rademakers. It is an adaptation of the 1958 novel The Darkroom of Damocles by Willem Frederik Hermans. It was entered into the 1963 Cannes Film Festival and was selected as the Dutch entry for the Best Foreign Language Film at the 36th Academy Awards, but was not accepted as a nominee.

Cast

 Lex Schoorel as Ducker / Dorbeck
 Nan Los as Marianne
 Van Doude as Inspector Wierdeman
 Guus Verstraete as Ebernuss
 Ko Arnoldi as Doctor
 Andrea Domburg as Marianne (voice)
 Jos Gevers as Uncle Frans
 Mia Goossen as Ria Ducker
 Elise Hoomans as Ducker's mother
 Sacco van der Made as German officer
 Hans Polman as Turlings
 Piet Römer
 Jules Royaards as Hubach
 Frans van der Lingen as Eckener
 Ina van der Molen as Elly
 John Van Eyssen
 Luc van Gent as Second inspector
 Marianne van Waveren as Fake Jugendstorm leader
 Ineke Verwayen as Jugendstorm leader
 Siem Vroom as Priest

See also
 List of submissions to the 36th Academy Awards for Best Foreign Language Film
 List of Dutch submissions for the Academy Award for Best Foreign Language Film

References

External links

1963 films
1963 drama films
Dutch drama films
1960s Dutch-language films
Dutch black-and-white films
Films based on Dutch novels
Films directed by Fons Rademakers